Charles Christopher Sheats (April 10, 1839 – May 27, 1904) was an attorney and politician, elected as a U.S. Representative from Alabama. He previously had served as the consul to Elsinore, Denmark, as the United States worked to expand trade in the Baltic Sea area.

Early life, education and career
Born to a planter family in Walker County, Alabama, Sheats was educated in a local school for the gentry.

Becoming involved in politics, at the age of 21, Sheats was elected as a member of the secession convention in 1860 but he refused to sign the ordinance of secession. He was elected as a member of the Alabama House of Representatives in 1861.

Civil War
Sheats was expelled from the Alabama House in 1862 for his adherence to the Union after the American Civil War had begun. At the time, he was imprisoned on a charge of treason by the Confederate authorities, but could not obtain a trial. He was not released until after the close of the Civil War. In 1864 he was an unsuccessful candidate for election to the Thirty-ninth Congress.

After the end of the war, Sheats was chosen to serve as a member of the state constitutional convention in 1865. He went on to study law and was admitted to the bar in 1867. He started his practice in Decatur, Alabama.

On May 31, 1869, Sheats was appointed by President Ulysses S. Grant as US Consul at Helsinger (often called Elsinore in English-speaking countries), Denmark. After signing of an 1857 treaty with Denmark that permitted the United States to have tariff-free passage in the Baltic Sea, the US was working in the postwar years to increase its trade in the area. Sheats served in Denmark until elected to Congress but regularly returned to the US.

In 1872 he was elected as a Republican to the Forty-third Congress, serving from March 4, 1873, to March 3, 1875. He was an unsuccessful candidate for reelection in 1874.

Sheats died in Decatur on May 27, 1904. He was interred in McKendree Cemetery, near Decatur.

References

External links

 
 

1839 births
1904 deaths
Politicians from Decatur, Alabama
People from Walker County, Alabama
Alabama Secession Delegates of 1861
Republican Party members of the Alabama House of Representatives
People expelled from United States state legislatures
Southern Unionists in the American Civil War
Republican Party members of the United States House of Representatives from Alabama
19th-century American politicians